The 1969 Columbia Lions football team was an American football team that represented Columbia University during the 1969 NCAA University Division football season. Columbia tied for last in the Ivy League. 

In their second season under head coach Frank Navarro, the Lions compiled a 1–8 record and were outscored 237 to 84. Kenneth Alexander and Richard Alexander were the team captains.  

The Lions' 1–6 conference record tied for last in the Ivy League standings. Columbia was outscored 170 to 68 by Ivy opponents. 

Columbia played its home games at Baker Field in Upper Manhattan, in New York City.

Schedule

References

Columbia
Columbia Lions football seasons
Columbia Lions football